Indian Mini Satellite (IMS) is a family of modular mini satellite buses developed by the Indian Space Research Organisation (ISRO).

Variants

See also

 Comparison of satellite buses

References

Indian Space Research Organisation
Satellite buses